Caleb Burns House is a historic home located at Maryville, Nodaway County, Missouri. It was built about 1846, and is a two-story, rectangular frame dwelling with Greek Revival style detailing.  It has a one-story rear ell and sits on a brick foundation.  It is the oldest surviving home in Maryville.  The Nodaway County Historical Society acquired the property in 1977.

It was listed on the National Register of Historic Places in 1980.

References

History museums in Missouri
Houses on the National Register of Historic Places in Missouri
Greek Revival houses in Missouri
Houses completed in 1846
Buildings and structures in Nodaway County, Missouri
National Register of Historic Places in Nodaway County, Missouri